Navigation Training School (NTS) is a training institute of the Indian Air Force based at AF Station, Begumpet. NTS moved to a new ergonomically designed training facility in 2010, which has a navigation simulator.

References 

Indian Air Force
Military education and training in India
Educational institutions in India with year of establishment missing